New York Magic is an American women’s soccer team, founded in 1997. The team was an original member of United Women's Soccer from 2016-2017. They played in the USL W-League from 1997 until the league folded after the 2015 season.

The team plays its home games at Iona College in New Rochelle, New York. The club's colors are red, black and white.

Over the years, the team has attracted high level players from many nations and top-level college programs. Its mission is to provide an avenue for the development of women soccer players in a highly competitive environment, and to provide wholesome quality family entertainment while developing the game of soccer in its community.  Since 2003, it has also developed powerful youth teams that enable New York area girls, ages 12 to 16, to train intensively and compete at a high level through the Super Y-League.

Magic's head coach, Nino DePasquali, was inducted into the Soccer Hall of Fame in 2007.

Year-by-year

Head coach
  Gaetano "Nino" DePasquale 2012–present

Stadia
 Stadium at Iona College, New Rochelle, New York 2008-date
 Stadium at Manhattan College, Riverdale, New York 2008 (1 game)

   

Women's soccer clubs in the United States
Magic
USL W-League (1995–2015) teams
1997 establishments in New York (state)
United Women's Soccer teams
Association football clubs established in 1997
Sports in New Rochelle, New York
Women's sports in New York (state)